The World Series Cricket West Indies XI was a cricket team representing West Indies in World Series Cricket (WSC). Their first game was against the Australia XI in 1977. World Series Cricket ended in 1979 after the Australian XI tour to the West Indies. The side was composed of current West Indian international cricketers, except for Jim Allen, the only squad member not to play Test cricket. During WSC many of the West Indian squad also played against the official Australian touring side, that did not feature WSC cricketers. Against in effect a second string Australia West Indies won the first two tests convincingly (by an innings in the first and nine wickets in the second). Only Alvin Kallicharran and Derick Parry played who were not signed to WSC. However, when the WSC cricketers were unavailable from the third test, the contests were more even. Australia won the third test (by three wickets), West Indies the fourth (by 198 runs), while the fifth was drawn.

See also
World Series Cricket results
World Series Cricket player records
WSC Australia XI
WSC Rest Of The World XI
WSC Cavaliers XI

West Indies XI
Cricket teams in the West Indies
West Indies in international cricket